The Prix du Meilleur Livre Étranger (Best Foreign Book Prize) is a French literary prize created in 1948. It is awarded yearly in two categories: Novel and Essay for books translated into French.

Prix du Meilleur livre étranger — Novel 
2020: Colum McCann, for Apeirogon (Belfond) 
2019ː Christoph Hein, for Glückskind mit Vater as L'ombre d'un père (Metaillié)
2018ː Eduardo Halfon, for Duelo as Deuils (Quai Voltaire)
 2017: Viet Thanh Nguyen, for The Sympathizer as Le Sympathisant (Belfond)
 2016: Helen MacDonald, for H is for Hawk as M pour Mabel (Fleuve éditions)
 2015: Martin Amis, for The Zone of Interest as La Zone d'intérêt (Calmann-Lévy)
 2014: Drago Jancar, for To noč sem jo viel (I Saw Her That Night) as Cette nuit, je l’ai vue (Éditions Phébus)
 2013: Alan Hollinghurst, for The Stranger's Child as L'Enfant de l'étranger (Albin Michel)
 2012: A. B. Yehoshua, for The Retrospective as Rétrospective
 2011: Alessandro Piperno, for Persecuzione. Il fuoco amico dei ricordi as Persécution
 2010: Gonçalo M. Tavares, for Aprender a Rezar na Era da Técnica (Learning to Pray in the Age of Technique), as Apprendre à prier à l’ère de la technique, Viviane Hamy
2009: Karel Schoeman for Hierdie Lewe (This Life), as Cette vie, Phébus, Paris
2008: Charles Lewinsky, for Melnitz
2007: Joseph McBride, for Searching for John Ford (as À la recherche de John Ford)
2006: Nicole Krauss, for The History of Love (as L'Histoire de l'amour)
2005: Colm Tóibín, for The Master (as Le Maître)
2004: Carlos Ruiz Zafón, for The Shadow of the Wind (as L'Ombre du vent) 
2003: Peter Carey, for True History of the Kelly Gang (as La Véritable Histoire du gang Kelly)
2002: Orhan Pamuk, for My Name is Red (as Mon nom est Rouge)
2001: Per Olov Enquist, for The Visit of the Royal Physician (as Le Médecin personnel du roi)
2000: Philip Roth, for American Pastoral (as Pastorale américaine) 
1999: Péter Nádas, for A Book of Memories (as Le Livre des mémoires)
1998: Anna Maria Ortese, for  The Lament of the Linnet (as La Douleur du chardonneret)
1997: António Lobo Antunes, for The Inquisitors' Manual (as Le Manuel des inquisiteurs)
1996: Jonathan Coe, for What a Carve Up! as Testament à l'anglaise
1995: Joan Brady for Theory of War (as L’Enfant Loué)
1994: Graham Swift, for Ever After (as À tout jamais)
1992: Jane Urquhart, for The Whirlpool as Niagara
1990: Tim O'Brien, for The Things They Carried as À propos du courage
1988: Margarita Karapanou, for  The sleepwalker (as Le Somnambule)
1985: Salman Rushdie, for Shame as La Honte
1984: Vasily Grossman for Life and Fate (as Vie et Destin)
1983: Hector Bianciotti, for L'amour n'est pas aimé
1973: John Hawkes, for The Blood Oranges as Les Oranges de sang
1969: Gabriel García Márquez, for One Hundred Years of Solitude as Cent ans de solitude
1966: Peter Härtling, for Niembsch as Niembsch ou l'Immobilité
1965: John Updike, for The Centaur as Le Centaure
1956: Alejo Carpentier, for The Lost Steps/Los pasos perdidos as Le Partage des eaux (Galimard)
1950: Miguel Ángel Asturias, for El Señor Presidente as Monsieur le Président

Prix du Meilleur livre étranger — Essay 
2020: Daniel Mendelsohn, for Trois anneaux. Un conte d’Exil (Flammarion)
2019ː Wolframm Eilenberger, for Zeit der Zauberer as Le temps des magiciens (Albin Michel)
2018: Stefano Massini, for Qualcosa sui Lehman as Les Frères Lehman (Éditions du Globe)
2017: Philippe Sands, for East West Street. On the Origins of Genocide and Crimes against Humanity as Retour à Lemberg (Albin Michel)
2016: Samar Yazbek, for Bawwābaẗ arḍ al-ʿadam as Les Portes du néant (Stock)
2015: Christoph Ransmayr, for Atlas eines ängstlichen Mannes as Atlas d'un homme inquiet (Albin-Michel)
2014: Göran Rosenberg, for Une brève halte après Auschwitz (Seuil) 
2013: Erwin Mortier, for Psaumes balbutiés. Livre d'heures de ma mère (Fayard)
2012: David Van Reybrouck, for Congo. Une histoire (Actes Sud)
2011: Marina Tsvetaeva, for Récits et essais (tome 2) (Seuil)
2010: Antonia Fraser, for Vous partez déjà ? Ma vie avec Harold Pinter 
2009: Pascal Khoo Thwe, for Une odyssée birmane (Gallimard)
2008: William T. Vollmann, for Pourquoi êtes-vous pauvres ? (Actes Sud).
2006: Diane Middlebrook, for Ted Hughes & Sylvia Plath, histoire d'un mariage (Phébus)
2005: Mikhail Shishkin, for Dans les pas de Byron et Tolstoï (Noir sur Blanc)
2004: Azar Nafisi, for Lire Lolita à Téhéran (Plon)
2003: Hella S. Haasse, for La Récalcitrante (Seuil)
1999: W. G. Sebald, for Les Anneaux de Saturne (Actes Sud)
1998: Verena von der Heyden-Rynsch, for Écrire la vie, trois siècles de journaux intimes féminins
1996: Michael Holroyd, for Carrington (Flammarion)
1993: Predrag Matvejević, for "Bréviaire Méditerranéen" (Fayard)
1977: Mario Praz, for La Chair, la mort et le diable (Denoël)
1974: Abram Tertz (=Andrei Sinyavsky), for Une voix dans le chœur (Seuil)
1966: Jerzy Kosinski, for L'Oiseau bariolé
1965: John Cowper Powys, for Autobiographie (Gallimard)
1964: Robert-Marie Grant, for La Gnose et les origines chrétiennes  (Seuil)
1963: Oscar Lewis, for Les Enfants de Sanchez (Gallimard)

References 

Meilleur Livre Etranger
Translation awards
Awards established in 1948
1948 establishments in France